Dragon Data Ltd. was a Welsh producer of home computers during the early 1980s. These computers, the Dragon 32 and Dragon 64, strongly resembled the Tandy TRS-80 Color Computer ("CoCo")—both followed a standard Motorola datasheet configuration for the three key components (CPU, SAM and VDG). The machines came in both 32KB and (later) 64KB versions.

History 

The history of Dragon Data in the period 1982–84 was a checkered one. The company was originally set up by toy company Mettoy, and after initial good sales looked to have a bright future. At its high point it entered negotiations with Rexnord's Tano Corporation to form a North American branch. Mettoy then suffered  financial difficulties, casting a shadow on the future of Dragon Data before it was spun off as a separate company. However, a number of circumstances (the delay in introducing the 64K model, poor colour support with a maximum of 4 colours displayable in "graphics mode" and only 2 colours in the highest 256 × 192 pixel mode, the late introduction of the external disk unit and of the supporting OS9-based software) caused the company to lose market share.

To combat this, under the control of GEC, Dragon Data worked on the next generation of Dragon computers; the Dragon Alpha (or Professional) and Beta (or 128). These systems only made it to the prototype stage before the business went into receivership and was sold on to the Spanish startup Eurohard in 1984. Eurohard also suffered financial problems and went into receivership a couple of years later after the release of the Dragon 200.

In addition to the Dragon 32 and 64, an MSX-compatible machine, the Dragon MSX reached the prototype stage.

References
 Smeed, D. & Sommerville, I. (1983). Inside the Dragon. Addison-Wesley.

External links
A Slayed Beast - History of the Dragon computer – From The DRAGON Archive
Dedicated DRAGON wiki

 
Defunct computer hardware companies
Defunct computer companies of the United Kingdom
Defunct companies of Wales
Home computer hardware companies
Computer companies established in 1982
Computer companies disestablished in 1984
1982 establishments in Wales
1984 disestablishments in Wales
Manufacturing companies of Wales